Kurt Heubusch (August 4, 1941 – March 12, 2006) was an Austrian sprint canoer who competed from the mid-1960s to the early 1970s. At the 1964 Summer Olympics in Tokyo, he was eliminated in the semifinals of the K-4 1000 m event. Eight years later in Munich, Heubusch was eliminated again in the K-4 1000 m event only this time it was in the repechages.

References
Kurt Heubusch's profile at Sports Reference.com
Kurt Heubush's obituary 

1941 births
2006 deaths
Austrian male canoeists
Canoeists at the 1964 Summer Olympics
Canoeists at the 1972 Summer Olympics
Olympic canoeists of Austria